Romford was a local government district in southwest Essex from 1851 to 1965. It was significantly expanded in 1934 and gained the status of municipal borough in 1937. The population density of the district consistently increased during its existence and its former area now corresponds to the northern part of the London Borough of Havering in Greater London.

Background and formation
Romford had formed a chapelry in the historic Liberty of Havering, becoming a civil parish in its own right in 1849. In 1851 a local board of health was set up for the parish; although its area was reduced in 1855 to cover only the southwest part of the parish covering the town. The local board convened at St Edward's Hall in Laurie Square from 1851 to 1853 and used the old liberty court house from 1853 to 1869. From 1869 it was based in offices in the marketplace and finally purchased the old court house in 1892. In 1894 the local board's area became Romford urban district as part of the Local Government Act 1894. This caused the parish to be divided into Romford Urban and Romford Rural, with the outer part becoming a component of Romford Rural District.

District and borough

From 1894 to 1900 the urban district consisted of the civil parish of Romford Urban. In 1900 the two Romford parishes were recombined and the urban district was expanded to cover the reconstituted parish of Romford from 1900 to 1934. The urban district was surrounded by Romford Rural District until 1934 when the rural district was abolished and the urban district gained the parishes of Noak Hill and Havering-atte-Bower. The urban district council continued to meet at the old court house until it was demolished in 1933. The Romford urban district was incorporated as a municipal borough in 1937 and the council moved to a new town hall on Main Road (formerly Hare Street).

Civic works
The local board purchased Romford Market in 1892. Public swimming baths were provided in Mawney Road in 1900.

Abolition
The Royal Commission on Local Government in Greater London considered the borough for inclusion in Greater London and in 1965 the municipal borough was abolished by the London Government Act 1963. Its former area was transferred to Greater London from Essex and combined with that of Hornchurch Urban District to form the present-day London Borough of Havering.

Population

Gallery

See also
John Basil Poel

Notes
: The whole parish from 1851 to 1855, part thereafter.

References

Districts of England created by the Local Government Act 1894
Districts abolished by the London Government Act 1963
History of the London Borough of Havering
History of local government in London (1889–1965)
Municipal boroughs of England
Romford
1851 establishments in England